James Ebenezer Saunders FRIBA (1829/30 – 24 November 1909) was a British architect and Liberal politician.

Early life

Career
Allinson states that Robert Worley, of the architectural practice Worley & Saunders, was "involved in all kinds of speculative developments".

Robert Worley and James Ebenezer Saunders formed the architectural practice Worley & Saunders.

Worley and Saunders designed the London Pavilion (now part of the Trocadero Centre), Piccadilly Circus.

He was made a Fellow of the Royal Institute of British Architects in 1866. In 1868, he became a member of the Metropolitan Board of Works, until 1885.

Saunders twice stood as a Liberal candidate for parliament at Dartford; at the General Election 1885 and at the General Election 1886, coming second on both occasions.

Buildings
His surviving buildings include:
 London Pavilion with Robert Worley (1885)

Personal life
His sons Martin Luther Saunders and Herbert Stanley Saunders were also architects.

References

Architects from London
1829 births
1909 deaths
Members of the Metropolitan Board of Works
Members of the London School Board
Fellows of the Royal Institute of British Architects
Liberal Party (UK) parliamentary candidates